Zarat (also Romanized as Z̄arāt and Zarāt) is a village in Farmeshkhan Rural District, in the Central District of Kavar County, Fars Province, Iran. At the 2006 census, its population was 603, in 162 families.

References 

Populated places in Kavar County